Sanjiv M. Ravi Kanbur (born 28 August 1954), is T.H. Lee Professor of World Affairs, International Professor of Applied Economics, and Professor of Economics at Cornell University. He worked for the World Bank for almost two decades and was the director of the World Development Report.

Kanbur is president of the Human Development and Capability Association (HDCA) from September 2016 to September 2018. He started serving a year as president elect from September 2015.

Early life 

Ravi Kanbur is British, he was born in India and brought up in India and England.

Education 
Kanbur gained his degree in economics from the Gonville and Caius College, University of Cambridge in 1975. He studied for his masters (1979) and doctorate (1981), also in economics, at Worcester College, University of Oxford. He studied under the Nobel Prize winning economist Amartya Sen and Sen has stated that his association with Kanbur has been beneficial to his writing.

Resignation as Director of the World Development Report 
In May 2000, Kanbur resigned as director and lead author of the World Bank's World Development Report. His resignation followed the publication of the initial draft of the 2000/2001 report on the internet. Kanbur's resignation came a year after the resignation of the World Bank's senior vice-president and chief economist, Joseph Stiglitz.

2000/2001 Report on the Internet 
Kanbur's initial draft argued that, "anti-poverty strategies must emphasise 'empowerment' (increasing poor people's capacity to influence state institutions and social norms) and security (minimising the consequences of economic shocks for the poorest) as well as opportunity (access to assets)." The final version of the report still contained the three central pillars of: (a) empowerment, (b) security and (c) opportunity, however the order was changed to (a) opportunity (with emphasis given to market-driven economic growth and liberalisation as ways of reducing poverty), (b) empowerment and, (c) security. The World Bank denied that US treasury secretary Larry Summers or anyone else had influenced the report to make it less radical.

Awards 
 1991 Quality of Research Discovery Award from the Agricultural & Applied Economics Association (AAEA) for the paper How serious is the neglect of intrahousehold inequality? 
 1994 Honorary Professor of Economics, University of Warwick

Personal life 
Kanbur is married to Margaret Grieco, Professor of Transport and Society at Edinburgh Napier University, Scotland.

Bibliography

Books 
 
 
 
 
 
 
 
 
Volume I only - 
Volume II only -

Chapters in books 
 
 
 
 
 
  DOI 10.2499/9780896295759

Journal articles 
1975–1979
 
 

1980–1984
 
 
 
 
 
 

1985–1989
 
 
 
 
 

1990–1994
  Pdf version.
 
 
 
 
 
 

1995–1999
 
 
 

2000–2004
 
 
 
 
 

2005–2009
 
 
 
 
 
 
 
 
 
 
 
 
 
 
 

2010–2014
 
 
 
 
 
 
 
 
 
  Paper based on Opening Plenary Address to the joint 13th EADI General Conference and DSA Annual Conference, University of York, UK, 20 September 2011.
 
 
 
 
 
 
 
 
 
 
 
 
 

2015 onwards
 
  Pdf.

Media articles

World Bank working papers 
  Policy Research Working Paper number 296. Pdf version.
  Policy Research Working Paper number 373.
  Policy Research Working Paper number 466.
  Policy Research Working Paper number 789.
  Policy Research Working Paper number 684.
  Policy Research Working Paper number 616.
  Policy Research Working Paper number 1080.
  Policy Research Working Paper number 1381.

See also 
 Feminist economics
 List of feminist economists

References

External links 
 Profile page: Ravi Kanbur – Cornell University

1954 births
Alumni of Gonville and Caius College, Cambridge
Alumni of Worcester College, Oxford
Cornell University faculty
British development economists
Feminist economists
Living people
World Bank people
Center for Global Development